The list of ship launches in 1784 includes a chronological list of some ships launched in 1784.


References

1784
Ship launches